Blue baby syndrome can refer to conditions that cause cyanosis, or blueness of the skin, in babies as a result of low oxygen levels in the blood. This term has traditionally been applied to cyanosis as a result of:

Cyanotic heart disease, which is a category of congenital heart defect that results in low levels of oxygen in the blood. This can be caused by either reduced blood flow to the lungs or mixing of oxygenated and deoxygenated blood.
Methemoglobinemia, which is a disease defined by high levels of methemoglobin in the blood. Increased levels of methemoglobin prevent oxygen from being released into the tissues and result in hypoxemia.
Although these are the most common causes of cyanosis, there are other potential factors that can cause a blue tint to a baby's skin or mucous membranes. These factors include hypoventilation, perfusion or ventilation differences in the lungs, and poor cardiac output of oxygenated blood, among others. The blue baby syndrome or cyanosis occurs when absolute amount of deoxygenated hemoglobin >3g/dL which is typically reflected with an O2 saturation of <85%.

Both of these conditions cause cyanosis, or a bluish discoloration of skin or mucous membranes. Normally, oxygenated blood appears red and deoxygenated blood has more of a blue appearance. In babies with low levels of oxygen or mixing of oxygenated and deoxygenated blood, the blood can have a blue or purple color, causing cyanosis.

Signs and symptoms 
The main sign of blue baby syndrome is cyanosis. Depending on the underlying cause of the cyanosis, additional symptoms may be:

 Failure to thrive
 Lethargy
 Nasal flaring
 Rapid heartbeat
 Rapid respiratory rate 
 Seizures
 Shortness of breath

Causes

Blue baby syndrome has been attributed to cyanotic congenital heart diseases and methemoglobinemia, however there are additional causes that could result in a baby becoming cyanotic, such as:

 Airway obstruction
 Decreased blood perfusion
 Disordered control of breathing (ex: Cyanotic breath-holding spells, seizures)
 Pulmonary/lung disorders (ex: Pulmonary hypertension, cystic fibrosis)
 Respiratory distress syndrome

Mechanism

Cyanotic heart disease 
Specific types of congenital heart defects that cause blood to pass directly from the right side of the heart to the left side result in cyanosis. In these defects, some of the blood that is pumped to the body has not been oxygenated by the lungs and therefore will appear more blue. Infants with these types of heart defects may have a constant bluish tint to their skin, or they may have temporary episodes of cyanosis. The degree of cyanosis is dependent on how much deoxygenated blood is mixed with oxygenated blood before being pumped to the body.

Cardiac conditions in which there is decreased blood flow to the lungs such as, tetralogy of Fallot or pulmonary valve atresia, result in less blood becoming oxygenated. There are also cardiac conditions such as transposition of the great arteries or truncus arteriosus, that results in an overall increase in blood flow to the lungs but with limited flow of the oxygenated blood to the rest of the body. Conditions in which there is poor blood flow to the systemic circulation, such as coarctation of the aorta suggests that the body does not receive the oxygenated blood it requires with resultant cyanosis.

The five most common cyanotic heart defects that may result in Blue Baby Syndrome include the following:

Methemoglobinemia 

Methemoglobinemia can be acquired or congenital. It occurs when the iron in hemoglobin is oxidized from Fe2+ to Fe3+, leading to poor binding of oxygen. Additionally, the oxygen that is already bound is held more tightly to the hemoglobin due to a higher affinity, resulting in less oxygen delivery. A methemoglobin level >1.5g/dL causes cyanosis. The most common congenital cause is a deficiency in the enzyme cytochrome b5 reductase which reduces methemoglobin in the blood.  

However, in infants the most common cause of methemoglobinemia is acquired through the ingestion of nitrates through well water or foods. Infants younger than 4 months are at greater risk given that they drink more water per body weight, they have a lower NADH- cytochrome b5 reductase activity, and they have a higher level of fetal hemoglobin which converts more easily to methemoglobin. Additionally, infants are at an increased risk after an episode of gastroenteritis due to the production of nitrites by bacteria. The sources of nitrate can include fertilizers used in agricultural lands, waste dumps or pit latrines. For example, nitrate levels are subject to monitoring to comply with drinking water quality standards in the United States and other countries. The link between blue baby syndrome and nitrates in drinking water is widely accepted, but as of 2006 some studies indicated that other contaminants or dietary nitrate sources, might also play a role in the syndrome.

Diagnosis 
When diagnosing blue baby syndrome, it is important to perform a thorough history and physical exam. When obtaining the history, it is important to determine the timing of symptoms and to ask about risk factors/exposures, such as prenatal history or access to well-water.

On physical exam it is important to visualize where the cyanosis is present to differentiate between peripheral and central cyanosis. Central cyanosis is typically visible as a blueish discoloration over the entire body and mucous membranes. In contrast, peripheral cyanosis typically has a blueish discoloration over the extremities. Cyanosis can be noted in babies around the lips, tongue, and sublingual area, where the skin is thinnest. In addition, it is important to observe the infant for signs of respiratory distress, visualized as nasal flaring, subcostal retractions, etc. Examination should include a respiratory and cardiac assessment.

One of the key tools in diagnosing is a pulse oximeter to determine oxygen saturation. While severe cyanosis can be easily noticed, an oxygen saturation as low as 80% causes only mild clinical cyanosis that is difficult to see. Additionally an arterial blood gas is useful, for example in the case of methemoglobinemia the PO2 can be expected to be normal even with a low oxygen saturation. Additional work up includes a complete blood count, blood glucose, blood culture, chest x-ray, and an echocardiography.

Babies with cyanosis due to congenital heart disease usually present with symptoms hours to days after birth. In addition to cyanosis, they often show signs of tachypnea (fast breathing), a heart murmur, and decreased peripheral pulses. If congenital heart disease is suspected in a newborn, doctors will likely perform several tests to evaluate the heart, including a chest x-ray, echocardiogram, and electrocardiogram. In tetralogy of Fallot, episodes in which infants become cyanotic are called tet spells, typically occurring during feeding or crying. When older, children may squat to feel relief since this increases the systemic vascular resistance causing more blood to go towards the lungs, resulting in increased oxygenation.

Babies with cyanosis due to methemoglobinemia also usually present with cyanosis in the neonatal period, but pulse oximetry may be falsely elevated and does not always reveal low blood oxygen saturation. . A CO-oximeter can be used to detect levels of methemoglobin in the blood if methemoglobinemia is suspected, by seeing the difference between oxygen saturation on an arterial blood gas and the measurement on a co-oximeter. Additionally, a direct methemoglobin level can be obtained.

Prevention/Screening 
As of 22 May 2007, the United States Environmental Protection Agency has established a maximum contaminant level of 10 mg/L for nitrate and 1 mg/L for nitrite in drinking water due to the potential harmful effects in infants.

A screening tool has been developed to screen for critical cardiac defects, which refers to cardiac lesions that require surgery or intervention in the 1st year of life. Screening for critical congenital heart defects should be done on all newborns after 24hours or shortly before discharge. Oxygen saturation is measured in the right hand and either foot.

A screening is considered positive if:

 Oxygen saturation <90% in either extremity,
 Oxygen saturation 90-94% in both extremities on 3 measurements separated by an hour each,
 Oxygen saturation difference >3% between both extremities on 3 measurements separated by an hour each.

Management 
Treatment for blue baby syndrome will depend on the underlying cause.

When evaluating a patient for cyanosis or respiratory distress, vital signs should be monitored, especially the patient's heart rate and oxygen saturation. It is beneficial to have vascular access established. In newborns, the pulse oximeter is typically placed on the right hand to determine pre-ductal oxygenation, referring to oxygenation before the ductus arteriosus (connection between aorta and pulmonary artery). This gives the oxygenation level the heart and brain receive. Traditionally, supplemental oxygen is given in an escalating manner beginning with free-flowing oxygen, progressing to positive pressure ventilation or continuous positive airway pressure, and ending with mechanical intubation. The goal oxygen saturation is between 85 and 95%. If an infant requires supplemental oxygen for a prolonged time it should be heated and humidified to avoid heat loss.

Cyanotic heart disease
Some babies born with cyanotic heart disease are treated with prostaglandin E1 after birth to keep the ductus arteriosus open and allow for more oxygenated blood to be pumped to the body. Many also receive oxygen therapy to increase the percentage of oxygen in the blood. Most of these babies will require surgery during infancy to correct their structural heart defect.

Severe methemoglobinemia
The first-line treatment for severe methemoglobinemia is methylene blue, a medication that will reduce methemoglobin in the blood. This is possible because methylene blue oxidizes NADPH, which in turn can convert methemoglobin back to hemoglobin.

Epidemiology 
Out of all the babies born with congenital heart defects, about 25% have cyanosis as a result. Tetralogy of Fallot is the most common cyanotic cardiac heart defect.

Methemoglobinemia is considered to be rare, with acquired methemoglobinemia encountered more than the congenital form.

Outcomes 
In the case of cyanotic causing heart defects, about 75% of infants survive to 1 year of age and 69% survive to 18 years of age. These individuals have an increased risk of developmental delay, heart failure, or heart rhythm disorders.

Methemoglobinemia responds well to treatment, its prognosis is associated with the level of methemoglobinemia and the degree of end organ damage it can cause. Death can occur when levels reach 70%.

History 
The first successful operation to treat blue baby syndrome caused by Tetralogy of Fallot occurred at Johns Hopkins University in 1944. Through a collaboration between pediatric cardiologist Helen Taussig, surgeon Alfred Blalock, and surgical technician Vivien Thomas, the Blalock-Thomas-Taussig shunt was created. Dr. Taussig had recognized that children with Tetralogy of Fallot who also had a patent ductus arteriosus (PDA) typically lived longer, so the trio tried to create the same effect as a PDA by joining the subclavian artery to the pulmonary artery, relieving the child's cyanosis. The operation was published in the Journal of the American Medical Association in 1945 and impacted management of blue babies around the world.

Anna was the name of the dog who was the first survivor of the surgery, considered an experimental procedure at the time. Anna survived the first pulmonary bypass after having been operated on twice. The second operation was required to replace the original stitches with flexible ones. After their success with Anna, Blalock and Thomas had the courage to perform the very first open heart surgery on Eileen Saxon in 1944. In 1950, Anna's story was made into a movie, and the film has been shown to various schools and other groups.

References

Neonatology
Syndromes affecting the heart